The Dave Dryburgh Memorial Trophy is a Canadian Football League trophy, given to the top scorer in the West Division. Unlike other CFL trophies, there is no East Division counterpart.

The trophy was established in November 1948, by sportswriters in Western Canada to honour Dave Dryburgh, the sports editor of the Regina Leader-Post who died in a boating accident in 1948. It was originally awarded to the top scorer in the Western Interprovincial Football Union.

Dave Dryburgh Memorial Trophy winners

References

Canadian Football League trophies and awards